Nirjala Tamrakar AKA "Mountain Queen"  (born 24 August 1979) is the First female, Nepalese, X-Country, Mountain Biking, Champion from 2001 to 2012 (12 years).

Personal
Born in Kumari Pati in Kathmandu, Nepal. Nirjala is one of 2 children, with a younger brother who is a keen road biker. Nirjala started out in her late teens as a professional model. For this career she was required to keep fit and it was through going to the gym that she got into first body building and then cycling. In 2001 some friends suggested she try her luck in a mountain bike race "The Himalayan Mountain Bike Race Series" and she won the National Women's Category. This proved to be her inspiration to leave modelling and pursue a professional career as a Cyclist for the Nepal National Team.
Nirjala's rise to fame and to working as a professional Athlete for the Nepal National Team was beset by difficulty that arose from the Patriarchy based society in which she grew up in. Although she competed at a National and International Level and at a higher Level than the majority of Nepalese Male riders she was marginalized by her own National Cycling Association who found sponsors and endorsement for her male counterparts. Despite this she continued and found her own sponsors (like Qoroz Professional Titanium Bikes) . She is now a key note speaker and role model for young women in Nepal and all over the World who have grown up in oppressive societies but dream of being recognized for their sports and achievements. The British writer "Jane Nobel Knight" wrote a book titled "The Inspiring Journeys of Pilgrim Mothers" and included a chapter on Nirjala's struggle and eventual success in her field .
Nirjala is now Married to "Daniel Wright" (British) and has a son "Percy". She is also a respected Mandala Artist (3 time Nepal National, Street Mandala Winner) and holds a Masters in Business Studies MBS.

Race history
 2001 - Himalayan Mountain Bike Race Series
 2002 -
 2003 -
 2004 -
 2005 -
 2006 - South Asian Games, Colombo, Sri Lanka (Road Race)
 2007 -
 2008 - 
 2009 - Asian Mountain Bike Championship, Mel-aka, Malaysia
 2010 - Asian Games - Guangzhou, China, S. Asian Games, Bangladesh
 2011 - 
 2012 - UCI World Cup Finals in Val D'Isere, France; Enduro (Gold), Gloucestershire, UK

Notable achievements
 First Nepalese Woman to cycle 22 days from Lhasa (Tibet) to Everest Base Camp (North) to Kathmandu (Nepal)
 First female to Win (2 times) the Highest Altitude, Endurance race in the World "The Yak Attack"
 First Nepalese Female to win a cycle race in the UK
 First Nepalese Cycle Athlete to compete in a UCI World Cup Finals
 First Nepalese Cycle Athlete to compete in South Asian Games
 First Nepalese Woman to complete a cycle race of the Annapurna Circuit
 Recipient of the - "Tamrakar Award Fund" - Ugrachandi Award (Nepal)

References

 Patriarch
 Qoroz Professional Titanium Mountain Bikes 
 Nobel-Knight, Jane, 14 July 2013  "The Inspiring Journeys of Pilgrim Mothers" Story of Nirjala Tamrakar's struggle to rise as a female Athlete in a male dominated sport and society, Page 101-116

1979 births
Living people
Nepalese mountain bikers
Nepalese female cyclists
Cyclists at the 2010 Asian Games
Asian Games competitors for Nepal
Sportspeople from Kathmandu